Sondok Airport  is an airport in Sŏndŏng-ni, Chŏngp'yŏng-gun, Hamgyong-namdo, North Korea.

History
During the Korean War, it was designated as K-26 by the USAF and was the target of one of Task Force 77's largest strikes during July 1953. In this airport YS-11 of Korean Air (leased plane from Japanese aircraft manufacturer) landed by hijacking in 1969 Korean Air Lines YS-11 hijacking). In 2002, Air Koryo operated services between Sondok Airport and Yangyang Airport in South Korea.

Facilities 
The airfield has a single concrete runway 02/20 measuring 8210 x 164 feet (2502 x 50 m).  It has a full-length parallel taxiway and a large apron on the north side.  It is home to a bomber regiment of 24 Ilyushin Il-28 jets, and 40 Antonov An-2s.

Airlines and destinations

References 

Airports in North Korea
South Hamgyong
Korean War air bases